The One, The Only... is the debut album of musician Chantal Claret, released on June 19, 2012 by The End Records and was recorded at Studio Edison in New York. "The Pleasure Seeker - EP" appears in the gallery of the iPod Classic on Apple's US site.

Background
Claret describes the album as “Tina Turner fronting Outkast at Bette Midler’s bat mitzvah.” She adds, “I wanted to make music that sounds like it could’ve been written in the ’60s or ’70s, but with a big fat hip-hop-like low end." "Pleasure Seeker" is the first song she wrote for The One, The Only... and was written about her father. Claret was originally very nervous about showing it to him, but he says that he "fucking loved it" and is proud of the song and plays it for everyone. "Honey Honey" was written for her husband, Jimmy Urine of Mindless Self Indulgence. For Urine's birthday, Claret took him to shoot guns with Michael Rooker at his private range. While there, Rooker kept using gun slang. A few weeks later, she was writing "Pop Pop Bang Bang" and called him to make sure she was using the correct terminology.

-Chantal Claret on her new solo album

Track listing

Personnel

Musicians
Chantal Claret - vocals for all songs
James Euringer - additional vocals in track 1
Pigeon John - guest vocals in track 12
Michael Goldstrom - guest vocals in track 13
Rob Kleiner - additional vocals in tracks 4 & 10, bass, guitar, organ, percussion in tracks 2, 3, 4, 6, 8, 10 & 13(except track 13 for guitar)
Carl Sondrol, John Whooley - horns in tracks 2, 3 and 8
Mher Filian - bass, guitar, keys, percussion & programming in tracks 1, 7 and 11

Other
Mark "Exit" Goodchild - mixing
Randy Merrill - mastering
ComicStrip Tease Music (BMI), Extra Credit Music (BMI) - publishing
Nick Walker - photos
Devin Toye - album layout
Eddie Applebaum, Matt Vogel, The Greenhouse Management - management
Michael Moses, BWR Public Relations - publicity

Notes

References
The One, The Only... CD booklet

2012 debut albums